The Catholic Church in Kyrgyzstan is part of the worldwide Catholic Church, under the spiritual leadership of the Pope in Rome.

Demographics
There are approximately 1500 Catholics in the country with three parishes (Bishkek, Talas, and Jalal-Abad) and Mass centers in other towns and villages. Jesuit Fr. Anthony Corcoran of the USA Central and Southern Province of the Society of Jesus is the current Apostolic Administrator, taking over after Janez Mihelčič on August 29, 2017.  The country is served by five Jesuit and two diocesan priests, as well as five Franciscan sisters. Most of the Catholics in the country are the descendants of Germans, Poles and other European ethnic groups who were deported to Central Asia by Joseph Stalin in the 1930s and 1940s.

History
The Catholics are mentioned in this region since 14th century, mainly on the territory of today's Kazakhstan. The Catholic missionaries came in Kyrgyzstan mainly from China, till turn of 19th and 20th centuries. Since 1918 to 1930, the area of Kyrgyzstan came under the parish of Tashkent. In 1937, there started the persecution of Catholic Church, the churches were destroyed and all priests were deported or executed. In that time, because of mass deportations into Central Asia (that had no parallel even in tsar era), came to influx of Catholics from Volga area, Ukraine, Poland and Baltic Sea area.

The first Catholic church in the country was built in 1969 by faithful of German descent, and was also granted legal recognition that same year. A second floor was built in 1981 because of community growth.

1991 to the present
After Kyrgyzstan's independence from the Soviet Union in 1991, the country became part of the Apostolic Administration for Central Asia based in Karaganda, Kazakhstan. In 1997, Pope John Paul II established the sui-juris Catholic Mission for Kyrgyzstan under the care of the Jesuit religious order. In 2006, it was raised to an Apostolic Administration and Nikolaus Messmer was named the country's first Catholic bishop. The Vatican has established diplomatic relations with Kyrgyzstan. The church operates relatively freely in the country, though it has had registration problems with the state committee on religious affairs. Priests have difficulty working in the country as many are foreigners and must get permits or student visas. Long-distance travel is common for the few priests in the country to visit the large number of small Catholic communities in the country. Ecumenical relations with other Christian churches are positive, especially at the local level.

See also
Religion in Kyrgyzstan
Christianity in Kyrgyzstan
Apostolic Administration of Kyrgyzstan

References

External links
The Catholic Church in Kyrgyzstan
Catholic Church in Kyrgyzstan (from the *Catholic-Hierarchy website)
New Bishops for Kazakhstan and Kirgystan - Germans in Russia Heritage Collection, North Dakota State University
First Catholic Bishop to Kyrgyzstan Consecrated in Rome - Jesuits in Europe News
Church Aids Victims of June 2010 Violence in Southern Kyrgyzstan - Catholic Relief Services
A Catholic Priest in Kyrgyzstan - America Magazine

 
Kyrgyzstan
Kyrgyzstan